Lois Foraker is an American film, stage and television actress. She was in the original Broadway cast of Godspell in 1976. She has appeared in such television series as M*A*S*H, After MASH, and The West Wing, as well as in the pilot episode of Northern Exposure.

Filmography
 Dirty Harry (1971) - Hot Mary (uncredited)
 The Candidate (1972) - Large Girl
 The Crazy World of Julius Vrooder (1974) - Delivery Girl
 The Four Deuces (1975) - Blonde Singer
 Getting Wasted (1980) - Nurse
 Gremlins (1984) - Bank teller
 The Exorcist III (1990) - Nurse Merrin
 Child's Play 3 (1991) - Sgt. Frazier
 Radio Flyer (1992) - Aunt

Television appearances

 The West Wing (2001)
 The X-Files (1999)
 3rd Rock from the Sun (1996)
 The Larry Sanders Show (1995)
 Untamed Love (1994)
 Rachel Gunn, R.N. (1992)
 Night Court (1990)
 Northern Exposure (1990)
 St. Elsewhere (1986–87)
 Murder, She Wrote (1984, 1988)
 After MASH (1983)
 Newhart (1982)
 M*A*S*H (1976–78)
 If Tomorrow Comes (Miniseries) (1986)
 My Boyfriend’s Back (1989) TV movie

References

External links

American film actresses
American musical theatre actresses
American stage actresses
American television actresses
Living people
Place of birth missing (living people)
Year of birth missing (living people)
21st-century American women